Fábio Lima may refer to:

 Fábio Lima (footballer, born 1981), Brazilian football centre-back
 Fábio Lima (futsal player) (born 1988), Portuguese futsal player
 Fábio Lima (footballer, born 1993), Emirati football forward